Feltus Mound Site (22 JE 500), also known as the Ferguson Mounds or the Truly Mounds, is an archaeological site located in Jefferson County, Mississippi, nearly  north of Natchez. The location is an Early Coles Creek site (dated 700 to 1000 CE) with four platform mounds clustered around a central plaza, although one of the four mounds has been leveled.

See also
 Emerald Mound
 Grand Village of the Natchez

References

External links
 
 
 
 
 
 Feltus Mounds : Vin Steponaitis interview about the 2012 dig at the Feltus Mounds funded in part by The Mississippi Department of Archives and History, and The University of North Carolina at Chapel Hill

Archaeological sites of the Coles Creek culture
Mounds in Mississippi
Geography of Jefferson County, Mississippi